Haliburton/Stanhope Municipal Airport  is located  northwest of Haliburton, Ontario, Canada.

See also
Haliburton Water Aerodrome

References

Registered aerodromes in Ontario
Buildings and structures in Haliburton County